The Hollywood Vampires was a celebrity drinking club formed by Alice Cooper in the 1970s. The hazing to get into the club was to outdrink all the members. According to Cooper in the documentary Prime Cuts: "The Speakeasy and Tramps were the place to be in London. There was a little loft at the Rainbow Bar and Grill in LA (W. Hollywood), they only had that for the club."

Members
Cooper listed himself, Keith Moon, Ringo Starr, Micky Dolenz and Harry Nilsson as the club's principal members: "It was that crowd, every night those same people. Every once in a while John Lennon would come into town or Keith Emerson and they would be honorable members of the night. They still have a plaque there at the Rainbow, where it says 'The Lair of the Hollywood Vampires'."

Although Brian Wilson and Iggy Pop often fraternized with members of the club, it remains unclear if they were formally inducted.

Additional members

Supergroup

In 2015, Cooper formed a supergroup named after the club with Johnny Depp and Joe Perry. They released their debut studio album, Hollywood Vampires, on September 11.

See also
 Son of Dracula

References

Clubs and societies in the United States
History of Hollywood, Los Angeles
1970s in California
1970s in music
1970s in American music
Alice Cooper